Nkawkaw Park is a multi-use stadium in Nkawkaw, Eastern Region, Ghana. The stadium holds 5,000 people.

Stadium usage
The stadium is used mostly for football matches and many other sporting events.

Residence
The stadium is the home stadium of Okwawu United of the Poly Tank Division One League.

References

External links
Nkawkaw Park Worldstadia

 		 	

Football venues in Ghana
Eastern Region (Ghana)
Sports venues in Ghana